Robert Milligan may refer to:
 Robert Milligan (merchant) (1746–1809), Scottish slaver and merchant
 Robert Milligan (politician) (1786–1862), British Liberal MP
 Robert Milligan (footballer) (1892–1915), Scottish footballer
 Robert F. Milligan (born 1932), United States Marine Corps general
 Robert Milligan (rower) (born 1952), British rower

See also
Robert Milligan McLane (1815–1898), American politician and diplomat
 Rob Milligan (disambiguation)